Ylistrum balloti, known as Ballot's saucer scallop is found around the waters of Australia. This scallop may live for a maximum of four years, and reach 14 cm in shell length, though more commonly 8 to 9 cm. Well regarded as seafood in Asia and Australia.

Distribution and habitat

The Ballot's saucer scallop is highly available throughout the Australian coast. A previous record from Indonesia was observed in 1991. A recent report confirmed from Borneo island (Sarawak, Malaysia) suggested the range is expanding to the north.

References

Pectinidae
Seafood
Molluscs described in 1861